William I of Champlitte (1160s-1209) was a French knight who joined the Fourth Crusade and became the first prince of Achaea (1205–1209).

Early years and the Fourth Crusade 
William was the second son of Odo or Eudes I of Champlitte, viscount of Dijon (son of Hugh, Count of Champagne) and his wife, Sybille. He married first Alais, the lady of Meursault. With the consent of his wife, he donated property to the Cistercian abbey of Auberive for the soul of his younger brother, Hugh in 1196. He later married Elisabeth of Mount-Saint-Jean, but they divorced in 1199.

William and his brother, Odo II of Champlitte joined the Fourth Crusade in September 1200 at Cîteaux. William was one of the crusader leaders who signed the letter written in April 1203 by Counts Baldwin IX of Flanders, Louis I of Blois and Chartres and Hugh IV of Saint Pol to Pope Innocent III who had excommunicated the whole expedition after the occupation of Zara (now Zadar, Croatia). They begged the pope not to chastise Marques Boniface I of Montferrat, the leader of the crusade who had, in order to preserve the integrity of the expedition, withheld the publication of the papal bull of anathema.

The crusaders took Constantinople on April 13, 1204. They gave the imperial throne to Baldwin IX of Flanders who was ceremoniously crowned on May 16, 1204, but William of Champlitte joined to Boniface of Montferrat who became king of Thessalonica under the new emperor. According to the Partitio Romaniae, a treaty concluded by all the leaders of the Fourth Crusade, the Republic of Venice received title to occupy, among other territories, the whole Peloponnese (in modern Greece).

Foundation of the Principality of Achaea

Early in 1205 Geoffrey of Villehardouin, one of William of Champlitte's old friends arrived to the camp of Boniface I of Thessalonica at Nauplia (now Nafplion, Greece). He had earlier occupied some parts of Messenia and now persuaded the king that even though the northeastern part of the Peloponnese was offering resistance the rest of the peninsula could easily be conquered. Geoffrey also offered to share the territory with William. Boniface I thereupon appointed William to hold the Peloponnese as a fief from him. Geoffrey of Villehardouin then paid homage to William and the two, with one hundred knights given them by the king plus each leader's own personal retinue, set off to conquer the rest of the peninsula.

From Nauplia William and Geoffrey of Villehardouin made their way north to Corinth, and thence along the coast of the gulf to Patras, where they took the city and the castle too. They continued down the coast to Andravida, where the local archons and the populace came out to meet them, priests carrying the cross and icons. The Greeks made obeisance to William as their new ruler. The fall of Andravida also meant the easy occupation of Elis. Wherever William met no resistance, he recognized the rights of the Greeks to their lands, customs, and privileges.

The conquerors met their first serious obstacle at the coastal fortress of Arcadia (modern Kyparissia), which they were not prepared to take. The crusaders continued to Modon (now Methoni, Greece), but the natives of Nikli, Veligosti, and Sparta, together with some of the Melingoi Slavs of Mount Taygetus and the mountaineers of Maina, formed an army in order to oppose their advance. The resistance was soon joined by a certain Michael who is identified by most scholars by Michael I Komnenos Doukas, who had made himself ruler of Epirus (1205–1215). William quickly fortified Modon and prepared to meet the Greeks. The battle which decided the future of Achaea was fought in an olive grove called Koundoura in the summer of 1205. Here the well-armed and well-disciplined crusaders won an overwhelming victory over the much more numerous Greek forces. Michael fled from the battle-field and William in short time occupied Coron (now Koroni, Greece), Kalamata and Kyparissia.

Although the peninsula had not been entirely overrun—for example Leo Sgouros still held out in Acrocorinth, Argos, and Nauplia—by the fall of 1205 William had assumed the title of Prince of Achaea. The name was derived from the region of Achaea in the northwestern part of the peninsula, one of the first regions the crusaders had subdued. The Achaea in the prince's title, however, was to refer to the whole Peloponnese. On November 19, 1205, Pope Innocent III, in a letter to Thomas Morosini, the new Latin Patriarch of Constantinople, referred to William as princeps totius Achaiae provinciae (‘prince of all Achaea province’).

However, the Venetians, in order to secure control of the key ports between Italy and Constantinople, demanded that their rights granted to them by the partition treaty of 1204 be recognized. Early in 1206 they occupied Modon and Coron, expelling the Frankish garrisons.

In 1208 William learned of the death of his brother Louis in Burgundy and decided to return home to France to claim the family lands. He left Geoffrey of Villehardouin as acting bailiff to administer Achaea until William's nephew named Hugh should arrive to replace Geoffrey of Villehardouin as bailiff. William, however, died en route home in Apulia.

See also
 Fourth Crusade
 Principality of Achaea
 Battle of the Olive Grove of Koundouros

References

Sources
 Andrea, Alfred J. (2000). Contemporary Sources for the Fourth Crusade. Brill. .
 
 Bouchard, Constance Brittain (1987). Sword, Miter, and Cloister: Nobility and the Church in Burgundy, 980-1198. Cornell University Press. .
 Evergates, Theodore (2007). The Aristocracy in the County of Champagne, 1100-1300. University of Pennsylvania Press. .
 
 Joinville, Jean de; Villehardouin, Geoffroi de; Shaw, Margaret R. B. (1963). Chronicles of the Crusades. Penguin Books. .

Further reading 
 Finley Jr, John H. "Corinth in the Middle Ages." Speculum, Vol. 7, No. 4. (Oct., 1932), pp. 477–499.
 Tozer, H. F. "The Franks in the Peloponnese." The Journal of Hellenic Studies, Vol. 4. (1883), pp. 165–236.

1160s births
1209 deaths
Christians of the Fourth Crusade
Princes of Achaea
House of Blois
Medieval French knights
13th-century people from the Principality of Achaea